Orsamus Holmes Marshall (1813–1884) was an American lawyer, educator and historian.

Biography
Orsamus H. Marshall was born in Franklin, Connecticut on February 1, 1813. In 1831 he graduated from Union College. He then studied for the bar, to which he was admitted in 1834. That year, he opened a law office in Buffalo, NY which later became Phillips Lytle LLP. He was one of the founders of the Buffalo Female Academy and of the Buffalo Historical Society. He also served several years as chancellor of the University of Buffalo. He wrote much in connection with the Iroquois dealings with European Americans. Posthumously there appeared a volume entitled Historical Writings of Orsamus H. Marshall Relating to the Early History of the West (1887).

He died at his home in Buffalo on July 9, 1884.

Notes

References

1813 births
1884 deaths
Union College (New York) alumni
19th-century American historians
19th-century American male writers
Leaders of the University at Buffalo
People from Franklin, Connecticut
Historians from New York (state)
19th-century American lawyers
American male non-fiction writers
Historians from Connecticut